Disguises or Robots in Disguise is the eponymous debut album by English electropunk band Robots in Disguise.

Track listing 
All tracks written by Robots in Disguise.
 "Boys" – 5:06
 "Postcards from..." – 4:06
 "DIY" – 5:55
 "Bed Scenes" – 3:51
 "Argument" – 6:00
 "Hi-Fi" – 3:20
 "Mnemonic" – 3:47
 "Transformer" – 4:10
 "50 Minutes" – 4:21
 "What Junior Band Did Next" – 4:18
 "Outdoors" - 4:59
 "Cycle Song" – 3:51

Personnel 
Robots in Disguise
 Dee Plume - vocals, guitars
 Sue Denim - vocals, guitars

Additional musicians
 David Westlake – drum kit
 Paul Stone – drum kit

Production
 Chris Corner – record producer, mixer, engineering
 Noel Fielding – artwork

Samples
 'Transformer' sampled David Sylvian's track: 'Backwaters' (1984)
 'Cycle Song' sampled Yello Magic Orchestra's track: 'Technopolis' (1979)

Release history

References

2001 debut albums
Robots in Disguise albums